289 may refer to:

289 (number), the natural number
the year 289 CE
the year 289 BCE
telephone area code 289 in the North American Numbering Plan
289 Nenetta, an asteroid
289 series, a DC electric multiple unit (EMU) train type in Japan
List of highways numbered 289